A common fund is a form of collective investment scheme based upon contractual law rather than being enacted through a trust, corporation or insurance policy.

The model for this type of arrangement is the Fonds commun de placement common in France and Luxembourg.  The common contractual fund in Ireland is another prominent example.

See also
 Collective investment scheme
 Fonds commun de placement
 Common contractual fund

Investment funds